Joseph Foster (9 March 1844 – 29 July 1905) was an English antiquarian and genealogist whose transcriptions of records held by the Inns of Court and the University of Oxford are still important historical resources.

Life and career
While his family was originally seated at Cold Hesledon and Hawthorne on the east coast of County Durham, Joseph Foster was born in Sunniside, Sunderland, and developed an interest in genealogy at an early age. Educated in private schools in the neighbouring towns of North Shields, Sunderland, and Newcastle-on-Tyne, Foster inherited his genealogical faculty from his grandfather, Myles Birket Foster (1785-1861), and published his first genealogical work in 1862, entitled "The Pedigree of the Fosters of Cold Hesledon in Co. Durham," at the age of 18. He was a nephew of the artist Myles Birket Foster.

Working initially as a printer in London, Foster continued to undertake genealogical research and became a prolific writer and publisher in the field. He undertook research into the histories of various families from the north of England, later publishing four volumes of Lancashire and Yorkshire pedigrees. He became friends with several Kings of Arms and heralds of arms during his lifetime, and the records of the College of Arms were often unreservedly placed at his service. 

His major works, still used by historians, were transcriptions of the admission registers of the Inns of Court (published in 1885 as Men at the Bar) and of the matriculation registers of the University of Oxford for the period 1500 to 1886 (published as Alumni Oxonienses).  This latter work was marked by the award of an honorary MA degree by the university in 1892.  It has been said of Foster that he was "no scholarly antiquary, but his energy as a transcriber and collector of genealogical and heraldic data has few parallels, and many of his publications remained classic resources, several of permanent value."

Foster died in London aged 61, at his home in St John's Wood, and was buried at Kensal Green cemetery.

Works
Foster's publications include the following:
 Some Account of the Pedigree of the Forsters of Cold Hesledon, Co. Durham (1862)
 The King of Arms (1871)
 The Pedigree of Wilson of High Wray & Kendal, and the Families Connected With Them (1871)
 A Pedigree of the Forsters and Fosters of the North of England, and of some of the families connected with them (1871)
 Lancashire County Families (1873)
 Yorkshire County Families (3 volumes) (1874)
 The Pedigree of Dawes, of Shawe Place (1874)
 (editor) Visitations of Yorkshire by Robert Glover (1875)
 The Pedigree of Sir Josslyn Pennington (1878)
 (with Edward Bellasis) Peerage, Baronetage and Knightage (1879)
 The Lyon Office and the Marjoribanks family (1882)
 Members of Parliament, Scotland (1882)
 Men at the Bar (1885)
 London Marriage Licences (1521–1869) (1887)
 Alumni Oxonienses (1715–1886) (4 volumes) (1887)
 Concerning the Beginnings … of Heraldry as Related to untitled Persons (1887)
 The register of admissions to Gray's Inn (1557–1859), together with … marriages in Gray's Inn Chapel (1889)
 Index ecclesiasticus, or, Alphabetical lists of all ecclesiastical dignitaries in England and Wales since the Reformation (1890)
 The Pedigree of Birkbeck of Mallerstang and Settle, Braithwaite of Kendal, Benson of Stang End (1890)
 Alumni Oxonienses (1500–1714) (4 volumes) (1891)
 Pease of Darlington (1891)
 The Royal Lineage of our Noble and Gentle Families (1891)
 Oxford Men and their Colleges (1893)
 The Descendants of John Backhouse (1894)
 The Pedigree of Ashworth of Ashworth &c. (1895)
 A Narrative of the Descendants of Richard Harris (1895)
 The Pedigree of Raikes, formerly of Kingston-upon-Hull (1897)
 Some Feudal Coats of Arms (1902)
 Two Tudor books of arms (1904)

References

External links
 
 

1844 births
1905 deaths
English genealogists
19th-century English historians
People from Sunderland
Burials at Kensal Green Cemetery
People associated with the University of Oxford
English male non-fiction writers
British heraldists